Greener Postures was Snakefinger's second full-length album, released by Ralph Records in 1980.  The record is co-produced with The Residents, who also co-wrote many of the songs.

Track listing

Ralph Records release 
 "Golden Goat"
 "Don't Lie"
 "The Man in the Dark Sedan"
 "I Come from an Island"
 "Jungle Princess"
 "Trashing all the Loves of History"
 "Save Me from Dali" 
 "Living in Vain"
 "The Picture Makers Vs. Children of the Sea"

KlangGalerie 2018 Bonus Tracks

Personnel 
Snakefinger: Performance

Blaine Reininger: Violin

References

1980 albums
Ralph Records albums
Snakefinger albums